Roberto Carlos Echeverría Boutaud (born February 23, 1976 in Cunco, Araucanía) is a Chilean marathon runner. He set a personal best time of 2:15:37, by winning the 2008 Santiago Marathon, earning him a spot on the Chilean team for the Olympics.

Echeverria represented Chile at the 2008 Summer Olympics in Beijing, where he competed for the men's marathon. He successfully finished the race in forty-ninth place by three seconds ahead of South Korea's Kim Yi-Yong, with a time of 2:23:54.

Personal bests
3000 m: 8:07.71 –  Santiago, 25 April 2007
5000 m: 14:06.4 (ht) –  Concepción, 12 May 2007
10,000 m: 29:28.05 –  Valdivia, 8 February 2014
Marathon: 2:15:37 –  Santiago, 6 April 2008

Achievements

References

External links

NBC 2008 Olympics profile
Tilastopaja biography

1976 births
Living people
People from Araucanía Region
Chilean male long-distance runners
Chilean male cross country runners
Chilean male marathon runners
Olympic athletes of Chile
Athletes (track and field) at the 2008 Summer Olympics
Pan American Games competitors for Chile
Athletes (track and field) at the 2015 Pan American Games